Strmca (in older sources also Strmica) is a small village west of Planina in the Municipality of Postojna in the Inner Carniola region of Slovenia.

Name
The name of the settlement was changed from Strmica to Strmca in 1994.

Church

The local church northwest of the settlement is dedicated to Our Lady of the Snows and belongs to the Parish of Studeno.

Gallery

References

External links

Strmca on Geopedia

Populated places in the Municipality of Postojna